Isobornyl cyclohexanol (IBCH, Sandenol) is an organic compound used primarily as a fragrance because of its aroma which is similar to sandalwood oil.  Its chemical structure is closely related to that of both α-Santalol and β-Santalol, which are the primary constituents of sandalwood oil.

Sandalwood trees are endangered due to overharvesting, leading to a high cost for the natural oil.  IBCH is therefore produced as an economical alternative to the natural product.

References

Secondary alcohols
Perfume ingredients